Vleuten is a railway station located in Vleuten, Utrecht, Netherlands. The station was opened in 1881, and is located on the Utrecht–Rotterdam railway. The train services are operated by Nederlandse Spoorwegen.

Train services
The following services currently call at Vleuten:
2x per hour local service (sprinter) The Hague - Gouda - Utrecht
2x per hour local service (sprinter) Woerden - Utrecht

Bus Services

 28 (Station Vleuten - Vleuterweide - De Meern - Leidsche Rijn - Utrecht Centraal - Utrecht Science Park)
 29 (Station Vleuten - Vleuterweide West - De Meern - Papendorp - Kanaleneiland - Station Vaartsche Rijn - Utrecht Science Park)
 111 (Station Vleuten - Haarzuilens)
 126 (Station Maarssen - Vleuten - Station Vleuten - De Meern)
 127 (Kockengen - Haarzuilens - Vleuten - Station Vleuten - De Meern)

References
NS website
U OV website
Connexxion website
Dutch public transport planner

Railway stations in Utrecht (city)
Railway stations opened in 1881
1881 establishments in the Netherlands
Railway stations in the Netherlands opened in the 19th century